Vale of York Academy  previously called Canon Lee School is a co-educational secondary school located in Clifton, York, England. The school is  still often referred locally as Canon Lee.

History
Canon Lee was built in Clifton to serve the north-west suburbs of Rawcliffe, Clifton and Skelton. The  doors opened in 1941. The first headmaster was Mr J Storey, and because of the war the school was also used as a hospital and refuge shelter (hence why it has such wide corridors).

In 1972 the first extension was built to accommodate the large number of pupils and to bring the school up to date this included a gym science labs maths and textile classrooms. It was extended again at a cost of £4 million in 1999 to accommodate the influx of students when Queen Anne's School closed.

In 2012, an all weather 3G football pitch was opened at the school by former England manager Steve McClaren. 

The school was placed in special measures following an Ofsted inspection in 2015. In September 2016 it was announced that Canon Lee would be renamed as the Vale of York Academy as part of a series of changes that include becoming part of Hope Learning Trust, York.

References

External links
 
 GOV.UK information
 Ofsted resports

Secondary schools in York
Academies in York